Beaudesert is a rural town and locality in the Scenic Rim Region, Queensland, Australia.

Beaudesert is the administrative centre for the Scenic Rim Region.

Geography
Beaudesert is south of Brisbane and west of the Gold Coast.

The area sources its income predominantly from rural activities such as cropping, grazing and equine activities, as well as tourism. 

In the Logan River and Albert River valleys, Beaudesert is a regional hub serving surrounding communities such as Rathdowney, Kooralbyn, Canungra, Tamborine Mountain and Jimboomba. It is approximately 91 kilometres from Brisbane and connected by the Mount Lindesay Highway.

The town of Beaudesert is located 46 m above sea level and has an average annual rainfall of around 916 mm per year. The temperature is around 30 °C in summer and falls to around 3 °C in winter. Generally the weather is mild, but some severe storms can arrive each summer.

In the east of the locality is the decommissioned Nindooinbah Dam. The much larger Wyaralong Dam is situated roughly 14 km to the north west of the town and was completed in 2011.

Climate 
Beaudesert experiences a humid subtropical climate (Köppen: Cfa, Trewartha: Cfal), with hot, muggy summers and mild winters.

History

Yugembah (also known as Yugumbir, Jugambel, Jugambeir, Jugumbir, Jukam, Jukamba) is one of the Australian Aboriginal languages in areas that include the Beaudesert, Gold Coast, Logan, Scenic Rim, Albert River, Beenleigh, Coolangatta, Coomera, Logan River, Pimpama, Tamborine and Tweed River Valley, within the local government boundaries of the City of Gold Coast, City of Logan, Scenic Rim Regional Council and the Tweed River Valley.

Mununjali (also known as Mananjahli, Manaldjahli and Manandjali) is a dialect of the Yugambeh language. The Mununjali language area includes landscape within the local government boundaries of the Scenic Rim and Beaudesert Shire Councils.

The town is possibly named after Beau Desert Park, the property of Charles Henry Alexander Paget, 6th Marquess of Anglesey in Staffordshire, England. Yet it is certain that Queensland's Beaudesert was named in about 1841 or 1842 by 'Ned Hawkins', or Edward Brace Hawkins (1821–1849), who was claiming the area as a sheep station on behalf of his employer William Henry Suttor senior (1805–1877) at Bathurst. It is not known why Hawkins picked the name Beaudesert. He was himself born in Newark-Upon-Trent in Nottinghamshire, the son of Thomas Fitzherbert Hawkins and wife Elizabeth of Bathurst fame, and it does not seem that he or his family had any personal connections to Beaudesert in England. Ned Hawkins moved on, not long after taking up Beaudesert station, to take up Boonara Station in the South Burnett.

In 1842 Nindooinbah pastoral run was established. In 1850 the Nindooinbah Homestead was built.

The town was settled in 1847, on Yugambeh lands, and has grown to a small, bustling centre.

The town was originally set out in a grid pattern; however, several of the streets followed cart tracks. The area was originally settled for growing cotton and sheep. However, the area is also notoriously short of water and the cotton was not a successful crop. Hoop pine was very successfully collected from the area. In 1863 the cotton workers were indentured labourers from the South Sea Islands, the first such use in Queensland. In the 1880s, the Cobb & Co stagecoaches ran between Beaudesert and Jimboomba.

Located in the Beaudesert Historical Museum is the Milbanks Pioneer Cottage. This cottage was originally built in 1875 by Patrick Milbanks on his Kerry property, out of local hand-hewn timbers, slats and shingle roof. It has four-poster bed, large cedar sideboard and numerous articles that portray the life of the early pioneers. It was donated to the museum by Patrick Milbanks's grandchildren and relocated to its present site in 1979.

Upper Beaudesert Provisional School opened circa 1882 and closed circa 1885.

Beaudesert Provisional School opened on 26 March 1882 but closed on 9 September 1886. On 13 September 1887, it reopened as Beaudesert State School.

On 15 August 1885 at Stretton's Hotel at Beaudesert, auctioneer C.J. Warner offered 125 town lots in the Beaudesert Township Extension estate. The lots were mostly  and were on Brisbane Street, Tubber Street, Gordon Street, Birman Street, James Street, Edward Street and Alice Street. The advertising noted that the Queensland Government had voted the funds to extend the railway line from Logan Village to Beaudesert.

The Beaudesert railway line from Bethania to Beaudesert opened on 16 May 1888. Beaudesert railway station served the town. Use of the passenger services declined with the increasing ownership of cars following World War II, leading to the termination of the passenger services in 1961. However the Beaudesert abattoir and the dairy farmers continued to use the freight services on the line until freight services terminated on 20 May 1996.

On Tuesday 24 July 1888, the foundation log of St Thomas' Anglican church was laid by Mrs De Burgh Persse of Tabragalba with an address given by Archdeacon Nathaniel Dawes.  On 24 November 1956 the foundation stone for a new church was laid by the Governor of Queensland, John Lavarack, and blessed by Archbishop Reginald Halse.The second St Thomas' Anglican Church was consecrated on Sunday 4 July 1965 by Archbishop Philip Strong. The 1888 church was used as the church hall.

Timber, cattle and dairying were the main industries in the area.

On 3 February 1889, Roman Catholic Archbishop Robert Dunne blessed the foundation stone for the first Catholic church in Beaudesert. The event raised £74 with a further £7 pledged. As 2 February was the Feast of the Purification of the Blessed Virgin Mary, it was decided to call the church Our Lady of the Purification, but it was commonly known as St Mary's. Dunne returned on 2 June 1889 to open the new church. It was built by James Madden of Ipswich, who design the church for free. It was fitted with an altar, altar rails and 20 pews. On Sunday 15 September 1907 the second St Mary's was opened, with the original church dismantled and re-assembled at Kerry where it was named St John's Catholic Church.

In 1897 a Baptist church was opened in Beaudesert on land purchased for that purpose in 1889. The foundation stone was laid in April 1897 and the church was officially opened on Wednesday 16 June 1897.

On 14 April 1901, the foundation stone was laid for St Mary's Convent School. The school opened on 19 August 1901 with an initial enrolment of 101 students and was operated by the Sisters of Mercy. The original timber building remained in use until 1939 when its condition was becoming dangerous. The school operated temporarily from the church until a new brick building was erected. The brick building was blessed and opened by Archbishop James Duhig on 3 September 1939. The timber building remains on the site as Mercy Hall. Further buildings were added over the years. On 19 August 2013, the 1939 brick building was badly damaged by a fire. However, the exterior and stained glass windows survived and the building was rebuilt, re-opening on 20 February 2015; it is now used for school administration.

The land was being sold following the death of its owner Ernest White.

The Beaudesert Shire Tramway to Christmas Creek, Lamington and Rathdowney, operated by the Beaudesert Shire, opened in 1903 and closed in 1944.

A local newspaper, the Beaudesert Times was established in 1908.

From the nineteenth century through to the 1980s, it was a thriving centre with a shoe factory and meat works as well as markets, a hospital and an ambulance service. The Enright family managed a major department store. The Blunck family managed an electrical store and a car servicing and sales business. As in many areas, globalisation has seen local factories and family-owned business taken over and closed with profits leaving the town where once they would have been reinvested.

The Seventh-day Adventist Church was officially opened on Sunday 20 August 1949 by Pastor F. A. Mote, of Sydney, the secretary of the Australasian Inter-Union Conference.

The foundation stone for the Beaudesert Baptist Church was laid on 8 October 1949 by C.G. Sweetman, President of the Baptist Union in Queensland.

From 1954 to 1962, the Beaudesert State School also provided a secondary school program, which ceased when a separate Beaudesert State High School was opened in January 1963.

In January 1955, the family of the late J. Klump built a memorial fence around the Beaudesert Methodist Church (later the Beaudesert Uniting Church).

Even though the area was known as Beau-desert (beautiful desert), the droughts and the floods were continuous problems in the area. In times of flood, houses, animals and people were washed away. The damage caused by floods is often recounted in historical documentation.

The Biddaddaba History Group brought together the history of the area from the earliest settlement of white people up to 1990 in a comprehensive book available from libraries.

The Beaudesert War Museum was unveiled on 28 September 1921 by Queensland Governor Matthew Nathan.

Beaudesert State High School opened in 1963.

Prior to construction, the site of McAuley College was blessed by  Archbishop of Brisbane, Mark Coleridge. It opened on 25 January 2017 with 36 students in Year 7. It was officially opened on 17 November 2017 by Scott Buchholz, Member for Wright with a blessing by Coleridge.

Timeline

Demographics 

According to the 2016 census of Population, there were 6,395 people in Beaudesert.
 Aboriginal and Torres Strait Islander people made up 7.2% of the population.
 80.6% of people were born in Australia. The next most common countries of birth were New Zealand 3.2% and England 2.7%.
 89.7% of people only spoke English at home.
 The most common responses for religion were No Religion 23.4%, Anglican 21.3% and Catholic 21.2%.

Heritage listings 
Beaudesert has a number of heritage-listed sites, including:
 Albert Street: Beaudesert Showgrounds
 7-9 Albert Street: St Thomas’ Anglican Church
 3180 Beaudesert-Boonah Road: Beaudesert Racecourse and Grandstand
 33 Brisbane Street: Beaudesert Masonic Centre
 80 Brisbane Street: Beaudesert Hotel
 82 & 84 Brisbane Street: Scenic Rim Regional Council Chambers
 Bromelton Street: St Mary's Catholic Church
 William Street: Beaudesert War Memorial

Education
Beaudesert State School is a government primary (Early Childhood-6) school for boys and girls at 17 Tina Street. In 2018, the school had an enrolment of 649 students with 49 teachers (43 full-time equivalent) and 29 non-teaching staff (20 full-time equivalent). It includes a special education program.

St Mary's Catholic Primary School is a Catholic primary (Prep-6) school for boys and girls at 1 Bromelton Street. In 2018, the school had an enrolment of 352 students with 26 teachers (22 full-time equivalent) and 19 non-teaching staff (11 full-time equivalent).

Beaudesert State High School is a government secondary (7-12) school for boys and girls at 271-297 Brisbane Street. In 2018, the school had an enrolment of 1442 students with 109 teachers (105 full-time equivalent) and 64 non-teaching staff (43 full-time equivalent). It includes a special education program.

McAuley College is a Catholic secondary (7-12) school for boys and girls at 30 Oakland Way. In 2018, the school had an enrolment of 93 students with 13 teachers (12 full-time equivalent) and 8 non-teaching staff (4 full-time equivalent).

Amenities
The Scenic Rim Regional Council has its headquarters at the Beaudesert Administrative Centre at 82 Brisbane Street (formerly the offices of the Beaudesert Shire Council).The Scenic Rim Regional Council operates a public library at 58 Brisbane Street.

The Beaudesert branch of the Queensland Country Women's Association meets at 86 Brisbane Street.

St Thomas' Anglican Church is at 7 Albert Street.

St Mary's Catholic Church is in Bromelton Street adjacent to the school.

Beaudesert Congregation Uniting Church is at 48 William Street (corner of Duckett Street) adjacent to the former church building.

Beaudesert Baptist Church is at 13 Eaglesfield Street.

Beaudesert Seventh-day Adventist Church is at 45 Anna Street.

The Arts Centre hosts a number of community groups and there is a wide range of community activity including a very active Bush Bards group.

A number of well-known sporting teams represent the local area, including the Beaudesert Kingfishers who play home games at R.S. Willis Park, Beaudesert Rangers soccer club who play home games at Selwyn Park, Beaudesert and District junior and senior cricket club who play home games at Everdell Park, Beaudesert Warriors rugby union Club who play home games at Everdell Park.

There is a rifle range and pistol club in Sprengler Road in neighbouring Tabragalba.

Beaudesert has a racecourse, 50-metre swimming pool, two gyms, showgrounds, caravan park and several hotels and eateries.

Attractions

The surrounding countryside includes numerous valleys leading up to the ranges dividing Queensland and New South Wales with creeks running through them and accompanying mountain scenery. Access to some of more remote areas is possible by camping in the Stockyard creek valley a branch of the Kerry Valley to the south of the town.

Il-Bogan Lagoon is a waterhole in the west of the locatity at 3169 Beaudesert Boonah Road. It is on the traditional lands of the Mununjali clan and they believe it is the home of a creature that moves through underground tunnels and waterways across their lands (sometimes referred to as a bunyip). British settlers also had sightings of strange creatures at the lagoon.

Events 
The annual agricultural show held in August-September is an event that includes a wide range of events and displays. It is run by the Beaudesert Show Society.

Transport

Bus
A bus runs from Beaudesert to Browns Plains and Brisbane on weekdays. Centacare St Mary's Community Services and the Beaudesert RSL provide transport for aged, disabled, veterans and hospital/respite requirements.

Rail
The standard gauge Brisbane-Sydney railway line runs through Bromelton, a few kilometres west of Beaudesert. This line is used by NSW TrainLink Sydney to Brisbane XPT passenger services and Aurizon, Pacific National and SCT Logistics freight services to Sydney, Melbourne, Wollongong and Adelaide. Services ceased calling at Bromelton station in 1994.

The Beaudesert railway line ran from the outer Brisbane suburb of Bethania to Beaudesert and was in regular use from 1886 to 1996. Until 1991 it had served the meat-packing plant on the outskirts of the town.

A petition from railway enthusiasts, and considerable grants of government money, resulted in its re-opening in 1999. Beaudesert Rail operated steam-driven tourist trains on the line for a short while thereafter. The company ceased operating in August 2004 after a series of fires, allegedly lit by sparks from the train, were set along the train line. The company was in debt and has ceased to exist, with the rolling stock liquidated and physical infrastructure demolished. Beaudesert Rail had also been trading while insolvent,  resulting in the closure of several local business who had extended them credit.

Notable residents
Neville Bonner, the first indigenous Australian to become a member of parliament, attended Beaudesert Primary School.
Caleb Daniel, current AFL player for the Western Bulldogs.
Jason Day, a leading PGA golfer who won the 2015 PGA championship, was born in Beaudesert. His father, Abby (Alvyn) Day was also born in Beaudesert but he died due to cancer when Jason was 12 years old. Jason's mother sold the family home to send Jason to Kooralbyn secondary school near Rathdowney as a boarder and then, when this school closed to Hills Academy where the school had a golf course. (Adam Scott, also an Australian golfer, also attended Kooralbyn). Colin Swatton was a teacher at Koralbyn and became Jason's caddie in a partnership which took them to the PGA win. Jason's first set of golf clubs was given to him when he was 4 years old by his father who found them at the local tip.
Riley Day, Australian sprinter, most notably competing in the 2018 Commonwealth Games, was born in Beaudesert and attended Beaudesert State High School. She is not related to golfer Jason Day, also born in Beaudesert.
Andrew Gee, Queensland and Brisbane Broncos player, was born in Beaudesert.
Mel Greig, an Australian radio and television personality, was born in Beaudesert.
Pauline Hanson, founder and leader of the right-wing One Nation, as well as a federal Senator for Queensland
Marilyn Leask, professor of education, was born in Beaudesert and attended the primary and high schools. She is descended from pioneering families who migrated from the UK in the middle of the 19th century.
Rick Price, musician, was born in Beaudesert.

See also

Beaudesert Shire
List of tramways in Queensland

References

Further reading

External links

University of Queensland: Queensland Places: Beaudesert
Town map of Beaudesert, 1978
Beaudesert photographs, State Library of Queensland

 
Towns in Queensland
South East Queensland
Scenic Rim Region
Localities in Queensland